This is the list of the most successful athletes who have won at least 40 World Cup races in the different World Cups of skiing events. As of March 2023, there are 44 skiers who achieved that feat and among them Swiss telemark skier Amélie Reymond tops the list with 163 World Cup victories. Austrian alpine skier Annemarie Moser-Pröll is the first person to reach 40 World Cup victories while Swedish alpine skier Ingemar Stenmark is the first male to do so.

List

 Ties are listed in chronological order.

References

External links
 

World Cup, Individual victories